This is a list of healthcare facilities in Brunei. This list includes government and private hospitals, as well as community health centres in the country.

References 

Hospitals
Brunei
 
Brunei